The men's middleweight boxing competition at the 2012 Olympic Games in London was held from 28 July to 12 August at the ExCeL Exhibition Centre.

Twenty-eight boxers from 28 nations were competed. Ryōta Murata, representing Japan, won the gold medal, defeating Brazil's Esquiva Falcão in the final. Both semi-finalists, Anthony Ogogo and Abbos Atoev from Great Britain and Uzbekistan respectively, were awarded bronze medals.

Competition format
The competition consisted of a single-elimination tournament.  Bronze medals were awarded to both semi-final losers.  Bouts were three rounds of three minutes each.

Schedule 
All times are British Summer Time (UTC+1)

Results

Finals

Bottom half

References

Boxing at the 2012 Summer Olympics
Men's events at the 2012 Summer Olympics